Weakley is an unincorporated community in Giles County, in the U.S. state of Tennessee.

History
A post office called Weakley was established in 1882, and remained in operation until it was discontinued in 1910.

References

Unincorporated communities in Giles County, Tennessee
Unincorporated communities in Tennessee